KCNO (94.5 FM) is a radio station broadcasting a country music format. Licensed to Alturas, California, United States, the station is currently owned by Edi Media, Inc. and features programming from Jones Radio Network.

History
The station was assigned the call sign KBGX on 1980-11-26.  On 1984-04-19, the station changed its call sign to KYAX, on 1996-04-15 to KKFJ, and finally on 1996-08-09 to the current KCNO.

References

External links

CNO
Country radio stations in the United States
Alturas, California